Control Machete is a Mexican hip hop group from Monterrey, Nuevo León. Its members are Fermín IV (listed as Fermin IV Caballero Elizondo in credits), Patricio "Pato Machete" Chapa Elizalde, and Toy Kenobi (Antonio "Toy" Hernández).

History
The group moved to the mainstream after their song "Sí Señor" was used as backing in the Levi's Super Bowl television commercial "Crazy Legs". However, their debut album was already a bestseller, with 100,000 units sold in Mexico and 400,000 in all of Latin America.
In 1998, Control Machete covered the song "Amnesia" included in the album Volcán: Tributo a José José, a tribute to Mexican legend José José.

Fermin IV left Control Machete in 2002 and released a solo album, Boomerang. He also collaborated with Cypress Hill on the track "Siempre Peligroso" on their album Los grandes éxitos en español.

Control Machete's track "Danzón" was recorded in Cuba with Buena Vista Social Club's Rubén González. The songs "Sí señor", "De Perros Amores" and "Pesada" were included in the Alejandro González Iñárritu film Amores perros and its soundtrack. The band's music was also heard in the 2005 film Land of the Dead ("En El Camino"), as well as the 2006 film Crank ("Bandera") starring Jason Statham. "Humanos Mexicanos" played in an episode from the fifth season of the FX series Sons of Anarchy.

The group's music has appeared in several video games, including Total Overdose, Crackdown, and Scarface: The World Is Yours.

Their 2003 album reached No. 18 on the Latin Pop charts.

The group has been on an indefinite hiatus since 2004. Pato and DJ Toy have collaborated with other artists and released their own solo albums. They have stated since that while they have no concrete plans to reunite, they don't discard the possibility if and when it feels right.

Discography
 Mucho Barato... (1997)
 Artillería Pesada Presenta (1999)
 Spanglish (2001)
 Solo Para Fanáticos (2002) (greatest hits)
 Uno, Dos: Bandera (2003)
 Eat, Breath, and Sleep (2006) (greatest hits)
Singles (2017)

See also
 Avanzada Regia

References

External links
Official Facebook Page
Official MySpace page

Mexican hip hop groups
Musical groups from Monterrey
Mexican music
Universal Records artists